The Irish League in season 1923–24 comprised 10 teams, and Queen's Island won the championship.

League standings

Results

References
Northern Ireland - List of final tables (RSSSF)

NIFL Premiership seasons
North
Football
Football
1923–24 in Northern Ireland association football